Jérôme Napoléon "Bo" Bonaparte (5 July 1805 – 17 June 1870) was a French-American farmer, chairman of the Maryland Agricultural Society, first president of the Maryland Club, and the son of Elizabeth Patterson and Jérôme Bonaparte, brother of Napoleon I.

Biography
Bonaparte was born in 95 Camberwell Grove, Camberwell, London, but lived in the United States with his wealthy American mother, Elizabeth. His mother's marriage had been annulled by order of Jérôme's uncle, Napoleon I. The annulment caused the rescission of his right to carry the Bonaparte name, although the ruling was later reversed by his cousin, Napoleon III.

It is speculated that Jérôme's prospective title is a reason the 11th Congress of the United States in 1810 proposed the Titles of Nobility Amendment to the U.S. Constitution that would strip an American of his citizenship if he accepted a title of nobility from a foreign nation. The amendment has never been approved, and lacked the approval of only two state legislatures at that time.

He graduated from Mount St. Mary's College (now Mount St. Mary's University) in 1817 and later received a law degree from Harvard, but did not end up practicing law.  He was a founding member of the Maryland Club, serving as its first president.

In November 1829, Jérôme Napoleon married Susan May Williams, an heiress from Baltimore, and it is from them that the American line of the Bonaparte family descended. They had two sons: Jerome Napoleon Bonaparte II (1830–1893), who served as an officer in the armies of both the United States and France, and Charles Joseph Bonaparte (1851–1921), who became the United States Attorney General and Secretary of the Navy, and also created the Bureau of Investigation, which was later rechristened the Federal Bureau of Investigation.

Jérôme Napoleon had refused to wait for an arranged marriage to a European princess, instead opting for the $200,000 fortune that Susan brought to the marriage. In an attempt to match the railroad heiress's dowry, the groom's maternal grandfather, William Patterson — one of the wealthiest men in Maryland — gave the couple Montrose Mansion as a wedding gift. Bonaparte died in Baltimore, Maryland, at age 64 and is buried at Loudon Park Cemetery.

References

1805 births
1870 deaths
English emigrants to the United States
Jerome Napoleon Bonaparte
Jerome Napoleon Bonaparte
People from Camberwell
Mount St. Mary's University alumni
American people of Corsican descent
Harvard Law School alumni
English people of French descent
English people of American descent
Patterson family of Maryland
Sons of kings